was a Japanese yuri manga magazine published by Houbunsha. It was published from February 2009 to December 2012 and had a total of 21 issues.

Authors

Mitsuru Hattori
Hiro Hoshiai
Izumi Kazuto
Tatsumi Kigi
Akira Kizuki
Aki Kudō
Yuka Miyauchi
Fūka Mizutani
Milk Morinaga
Nawoko
Hidari Ōgawa
Megane Ōtomo
Hiroki Ugawa (Koburiawase) 
Nodoka Tsurimaki
Atsushi Yoshinari
Akihito Yoshitomi (Sisterism)
Kenn Kurogane (Hoshikawa Ginza Yonchōme)

References

External links

2009 establishments in Japan
2012 disestablishments in Japan
Defunct magazines published in Japan
Houbunsha magazines
Bi-monthly manga magazines published in Japan
Quarterly manga magazines published in Japan
Magazines established in 2009
Magazines disestablished in 2012
Yuri (genre) manga magazines